Gavar (also known as Gawar, Gouwar, Gauar, Rtchi, Kortchi, Ma-Gavar) is an Afro-Asiatic language spoken in Cameroon in the Far North Region.

Gavar is spoken most of Gavar canton, through which the Mayo-Gawar River flows, and in Gadala in the southeast of Mokolo commune (Mayo-Tsanaga Department, Far North Region).

Notes 

Biu-Mandara languages
Languages of Cameroon